Rest on the Flight into Egypt is a 1630 painting by Anthony van Dyck, probably commissioned by a layman. Featuring the Holy Family of Joseph, Mary, and Jesus, it was owned by Maximilian II Emanuel, Elector of Bavaria and is now in the Alte Pinakothek in Munich. The Rest on the Flight into Egypt was a popular subject in art.

Bibliography
Gian Pietro Bellori, Vite de' pittori, scultori e architecti moderni, Torino, Einaudi, 1976.
Didier Bodart, Van Dyck, Prato, Giunti, 1997.
Christopher Brown, Van Dyck 1599-1641, Milano, RCS Libri, 1999, .
Justus Müller Hofstede, Van Dyck, Milano, Rizzoli/Skira, 2004.
Stefano Zuffi, Il Barocco, Verona, Mondadori, 2004.

1630 paintings
Religious paintings by Anthony van Dyck
Collection of the Alte Pinakothek
van Dyck